Xoom Corporation (also known as Xoom, a PayPal Service) is an electronic funds transfer or remittance provider that allows consumers to send money, pay bills and reload mobile phones from the United States and Canada to 131 countries.

History 
Xoom Corporation was founded in 2001 and has its headquarters in San Francisco, California.

In June 2010, Xoom was cited in a study by the Inter-American Dialogue of 79 remittance service providers as having amongst the highest consumer satisfaction ratings.

In March 2011, and in September 2012, Xoom was listed in the "Wall Street Journal's" annual "Next Big Thing List" list of the 50 most promising venture-backed companies.

In October 2012, in a follow-up survey by the Inter-American Dialogue of 51 remittance service providers for the US to Latin America market, ranked Xoom top for fees charged and countries served.

Funding and ownership 
On September 28, 2007, Xoom closed a first E-series round of financing for $20 million. Peter Thiel was an early investor in Xoom Corporation.

Xoom went public on February 15, 2013.

In November 2015, PayPal acquired Xoom Corporation for $25 a share, to a total of about $1.09 billion.

See also
Sequoia Capital
Xoom (web hosting), the original owner of xoom.com

Further reading

References

External links

2013 initial public offerings
Companies based in San Francisco
Financial services companies established in 2001
American companies established in 2001
Financial services companies of the United States
Online remittance providers
Payment service providers
2015 mergers and acquisitions
PayPal